The 1975 British Columbia general election was the 31st general election in the Province of British Columbia, Canada. It was held to elect members of the Legislative Assembly of British Columbia. The election was called on November 3, 1975, and held on December 11, 1975.  The new legislature met for the first time on March 17, 1976.

The governing New Democratic Party of Dave Barrett was defeated after three years in government.  Bill Bennett, son of long-time Social Credit Party leader and BC premier, W.A.C. Bennett, led Social Credit back to power, winning close to half of the popular vote, and a solid majority in the legislature.

Voters abandoned the Liberal and Progressive Conservative parties as the centre and right-wing vote coalesced around Social Credit. The defeated social democratic NDP suffered only a marginal decrease in its vote share. However, NDP support outside Vancouver tailed off, resulting in a 20-seat loss. Barrett was one of the casualties; he was narrowly defeated by a Socred challenger (though he returned to the legislature a few months later in a by-election).

Results

Notes:

* Party did not nominate candidates in the previous election.
 
x - less than 0.005% of the popular vote

See also
List of British Columbia political parties

Further reading
 

1975
1975 elections in Canada
1975 in British Columbia
December 1975 events in Canada